The 1866 Leominster by-election was an uncontested election held on 26 February 1866. The by-election was brought about due to the resignation of the incumbent Conservative MP, Gathorne Hardy in order to take up his Oxford University seat. It was won by the Conservative candidate Richard Arkwright, who was the only declared candidate.

See also

List of United Kingdom by-elections (1857–1868)

References

1866 in England
Leominster
1866 elections in the United Kingdom
By-elections to the Parliament of the United Kingdom in Herefordshire constituencies
19th century in Sussex
February 1866 events